Gobius kolombatovici is a species of goby native to the northern Adriatic Sea where it occurs at depths of from  in areas with patches of rock and softer sediments.  This species can reach a length of  SL. The specific name honours the Croatian mathematician, naturalist and taxonomist Juraj Kolombatovic (1843-1908), who carried out extensive work on the small inshore fishes of the Adriatic Sea.

References
 Kovacic M.,  Miller P.J. (2000) A new species of Gobius (Teleostei: Gobiidae) from the northern Adriatic Sea. Cybium, 24(3): 231–239.

kolombatovici
Fish of Europe
Endemic fauna of Croatia
Fish of the Adriatic Sea
Fish described in 2000